Igor Decraene (26 January 1996, in Waregem – 30 August 2014, in Zulte) was a Belgian cyclist. In 2013, he became the UCI world junior men's time trial champion. The event took place on 24 September in Florence, Tuscany, Italy. In 2013 and 2014 he was also the Belgian  national champion in the time trial for juniors men. He also won the Crystal Bicycle for Best Young Rider in 2013. At the time of his death, he was preparing to defend his junior world time trial title at the 2014 UCI Road World Championships in Ponferrada, Spain on 23 September.

Decraene, aged 18, died in an accident on 30 August 2014 near Zulte, East Flanders. Initial media reports suggested that he had taken his own life, however the family and police denied this was the case. He was riding home from a party when he was hit and killed by a train.

Major results
2013
 1st  Time trial, UCI Junior Road World Championships
 1st  Time trial, National Junior Road Championships
 1st Chrono des Nations Juniors
 1st Stage 2a (ITT) Keizer der Juniores
 2nd  Time trial, UEC European Junior Road Championships
2014
 1st  Time trial, National Junior Road Championships

References

External links
 Igor Decraene at le site du Cyclisme 

1996 births
2014 deaths
Belgian male cyclists
People from Waregem
Railway accident deaths in Belgium
Cyclists from West Flanders